Agulo is located on the north coast of the island of La Gomera in the province of Santa Cruz de Tenerife of the Canary Islands. It is located 13 km northwest of the capital San Sebastián de la Gomera. The population was 1,100 in 2013.

Nature and agriculture 
Agulo is known as the "green balcony". The Meriga Forest is part of UNESCO's World Heritage Site, and is part of the Garajonay National Park. The main crop cultivated are bananas.

Subdivisions 
 Agulo 
 Lepe 
 La Palmita
 Las Rosas
 Cruz de Tierno
 Juego de Bolas
 Meriga
 Pajar de Bento
 Piedra Gorda
 Serpa
 La Vega

Gallery

See also 
 List of municipalities in Santa Cruz de Tenerife

References

Further reading 
  Brown, A. Samler.  Madeira, Canary Islands and Azores.  (London, S.E.: Sampson Low, Marston & Co., Limited, 1908).

External links 

 La Gomera Island blog

Municipalities in La Gomera